Record of Xuan He Era Tribute Tea in Bei Yuan District is a book written by Xiong Fan during the Song Dynasty.

The book contains detailed descriptions of the names of various tribute tea cakes and their packaging, some even with dimensions. Two examples of such descriptions are "Longevity Dragon cake, silver mold, bamboo frame, one inch diameter" and "Eternal Spring Jade Leaf, bamboo frame, diameter 3½ inch.".

The book is one of the Chinese tea classics, ancient treatises on tea.

See also
Chinese tea

References

Song dynasty literature
Chinese tea classic texts